State Correctional Institution – Benner Township, commonly referred to as SCI Benner, is a Medium-Security correctional facility for males located in Benner Township, Centre County, Pennsylvania. It is one of twenty six state-level correctional institutions of the Pennsylvania Department of Corrections System. SCI Benner sits adjacent to SCI Rockview.

History
The construction of SCI Benner was approved with the passage of the 2008 Capital Budget. Groundbreaking was held in August 2009, and in March 2011, the first footer was in place. The contractor was Hensel Phelps. Costing $200 million to construct, the prison consists of 46 acres inside the perimeter's fence and 589,492 square footage under roof. An addition of a 50,000 Correctional Industries laundry facility is planned, bringing the building count to 26. The prison accepted its first inmates on April 15, 2013.

Capacity
According to the June 30, 2015 Inmate Capacity Report issued on the DOC website, there are 2,087 Inmates currently housed at Benner Township, exceeding the 1,900 inmate capacity by 187 additional inmates, meaning that the prison is at nearly 110% capacity.

See also
 List of Pennsylvania state prisons

References

External links
 PA Dept of Corrections Web site
 Benner Correctional Institution

Prisons in Pennsylvania
Buildings and structures in Erie County, Pennsylvania
2013 establishments in Pennsylvania